Wolf Run is a  long 2nd order tributary to Buffalo Creek in Washington County, Pennsylvania.

Variant names
According to the Geographic Names Information System, it has also been known historically as:
Pleasant Run

Course
Wolf Run rises about 2 miles west of Wolfdale, Pennsylvania, in Washington County and then flows southwest to join Buffalo Creek at Taylorstown.

Watershed
Wolf Run drains  of area, receives about 39.8 in/year of precipitation, has a wetness index of 328.10, and is about 45% forested.

See also
List of Pennsylvania Rivers

References

Rivers of Pennsylvania
Rivers of Washington County, Pennsylvania